A wimpel (from German, "cloth," derived from Old German, bewimfen, meaning "to cover up" or "conceal") is a long, linen sash used as a binding for the Sefer Torah by Jews of Germanic (Yekke) origin. It is made from the cloth used to swaddle a baby boy at his bris milah, uniting the communal world of the synagogue with the individual's own life cycle.

The wimpel is an offshoot of a common Jewish practice. In the times of the Tannaim, all Torah scrolls were wrapped only with a cloth, known in Hebrew as a “mappah,” or in German, a “wimpel.” As with other holy Judaic objects, donating a mappah was considered to be a great mitzvah and honor, and very often a groom would donate one on the eve of his wedding. Most of these were made from old clothing. While some Rabbis approved of this practice, others did not because they felt that it was not proper respect for the Torah. Unlike these controversial “second-hand” mappot, the cloth used at a baby's circumcision was undoubtedly holy, and it gradually became the custom to donate these as mappot.

There are many variations as to what takes place at the actual wimpel ceremony. One common approach is to bring it to synagogue when the boy turns three and is toilet-trained. He and his father get the aliyah of gelilah, and together they wrap the wimpel around the Torah. (Variations include the child's age, the type of aliyah, and the extent of the child's participation in the actual ceremony.) Afterwards, the family invites the community to join them for a kiddush, a small celebratory party.

This custom is still observed today by most members of the German community. It is an extremely joyous occasion, and its main purpose is to instill a love and enthusiasm for shul and Judaism within the child.

Origins
Some attribute the origins of the custom to a story recorded about a time when the Maharil was the sandek for a circumcision. The circumciser, known as the "mohel", performed the circumcision, and then realized that he had forgotten to bring a bandage. The Maharil understood that this was a life-threatening situation, and he instructed the mohel to use a mappah from one of the synagogue's Torah scrolls as a bandage. Then the Maharil instructed the child's parents to wash it once they were done with it and return it to the synagogue with a minor contribution to reimburse the synagogue for their use of the mappah. However, there are reasons to believe that the practice of using the cloth from the circumcision predates the Maharil, and the story is only of interest to illustrate that the cloth, even after being sanctified with the holiness of the Sefer Torah, may be used for the wrapping of the baby at the circumcision. See Rabbi Rabbi Binyamin Shlomo Hamburger's Shoroshei Minhag Ashkenaz for more details about this discussion.

This incident highlighted the connection between the Torah and circumcision, as both relate to covenants that the Jewish people have with God (the covenants of Torah and circumcision). The custom gradually developed into the one that is practiced today by German Jews: At a baby's circumcision, the mohel places a long swatch of white cloth - the wimpel – under the pillow. Afterwards, the wimpel is beautifully decorated – it can be either painted or embroidered – with the child's name, date of birth, and the Hebrew phrase which states “Just like he entered the [covenant of] circumcision, so too he should [the covenant of] Torah, marriage, and good deeds.” Some mothers do the artwork themselves; others retain the services of “wimpel professionals,” e.g., men or women who do this as a side job or hobby.

Another explanation comes from an 80-year-old lady who remembers a ceremony from her synagogue in Germany, where the young child was brought to the synagogue once he was free of diapers, and the women would throw the wimpel on the Torah, while the men carried the Torah below the Court of Women (Ezrat Nashim).

The wimpel was then dedicated to the synagogue, symbolizing the fact the child is now pure, and can take part in the service.

Creating the wimpel
The wimpel is created shortly after the brit milah using the swaddling cloth that was used at that ceremony. The cloth is cleaned, cut into strips and sewn into a sash measuring six or seven inches wide and ten or twelve feet long. The child's Hebrew name and date of birth are painted or embroidered onto the cloth, usually by the mother or grandmother, along with the traditional blessing:

 ה' יגדלהו לתורה ולחופה ולמעשים טובים אמן
"...may God raise him up to [a life of] Torah, a successful marriage, and good deeds, Amen."

Symbols and Motifs

Bringing the wimpel

When the child comes of age to begin learning Torah (age 3), he and his family bring the wimpel to the synagogue for Shabbat morning services. After the Torah reading, the child performs the ritual of gelila, perhaps with the help of his father, by wrapping the wimpel many times around the Torah scroll and tucking the end of the cloth into the folds. In this way, the child's individual responsibilities to God and His commandments are literally wrapped around his communal responsibilities, a figurative lesson for the child and his family.

Rabbi Shimon Schwab, Rav of Khal Adath Yeshurun synagogue in Washington Heights, New York, which revived the custom among the younger generation of Yekke congregants, suggested that perhaps the source of the wimpel custom was to avoid knotting and unknotting a tie around the Torah on Shabbat (see the 39 categories of activity prohibited on the Sabbath).

On that first Shabbat that the wimpel is presented and used, the child's family makes a kiddush in honor of their son's entering into a life of Torah.

Other uses
The synagogue typically receives many more wimpels than Torah scrolls. The wimpels are often stored in a drawer in the Ark. A boy's wimpel would then be placed on the Torah on other special occasions in his life, such as his Bar Mitzvah, Aufruf, and other important family events.

Some wimpels were even used as a decorative banner on the chuppah itself.

Lengnau Mappot 
One of the most extensive collections of wimpels was found in the 1960s in the Surbtal in the Swiss canton of Aargau. The 218 textiles, which had been discovered in the women's gallery of the synagogue in Lengnau, span three centuries. The oldest one dates back to 1655. In 1967 the wimpels were examined by Dr. Florence Guggenheim-Grünberg. They are now part of the collection of the Jewish Museum of Switzerland.

Notes and references

Bibliography 

 Lubrich, Naomi (ed.), Birth Culture. Jewish Testimonies from Rural Switzerland and Environs, Basel 2022. ISBN  978-3796546075
 Ehrenfreund-Michler, Dinah: Wickelgeschichten. Die Lengnauer Tora-Wimpel. In: Bhend, Angela/Picard, Jacques: Jüdischer Kulturraum Aargau 2020, S. 212-214.
 Feuchtwanger-Sarig, Naomi: Torah Binders from Denmark. In: Gelfer-Jørgensen, Mirjam (Hg.): Danish Jewish Art. Jews in Danish Art. Kopenhagen 1999, S.382-435.

External links 
 Das Schultragen The Presentation at the Synagogue, 1869 By Moritz Daniel Oppenheim
 Photo of wimpel made in Germany in 1694
wimpel.org Information and instructions for modern-day wimpel-making

Jews and Judaism in Germany
Ashkenazi Jews topics
Birth in Judaism
Yiddish words and phrases
Jewish ritual objects
German-Jewish culture in Germany
Yekke